Anti-gliadin antibodies are produced in response to gliadin, a prolamin found in wheat. In bread wheat it is encoded by three different alleles, AA, BB, and DD. These alleles can produce slightly different gliadins, which can cause the body to produce different antibodies. Some of these antibodies can detect proteins in specific grass taxa such as Triticeae (Triticeae glutens), while others react sporadically with certain species in those taxa, or over many taxonomically defined grass tribes.

Subtypes

Anti-gliadin IgA
This antibody is found in ~80% of patients with coeliac disease. It is directed
against the alpha/beta and gamma (α,β,γ) gliadins.  It is also found in a number of patients who are not enteropathic. Some of these patients may have neuropathies that respond favorably to a gluten elimination diet. This is referred to as gluten-sensitive idiopathic neuropathy. Clinically these antibodies and IgG antibodies to gliadin are abbreviated as AGA.

Anti-gliadin IgG
The IgG antibody is similar to AGA IgA, but is found at higher levels in patients with the IgA-less phenotype. It is also associated with coeliac disease and non-celiac gluten sensitivity.

Anti-gliadin antibodies are frequently found with anti-transglutaminase antibodies.

Anti-gliadin IgE
The IgE antibodies are more typically found in allergy-related conditions such as urticaria, asthma, and wheat-dependent exercise-induced anaphylaxis. The target of the most allergenic antibodies is ω-5 gliadin,  which is encoded by the Gli-1B gene found on the B haplome (Aegilops speltoides derived) of wheat.

Gluten-free diet

What is the relationship of gluten and anti-gliadin antibodies? In gluten-sensitive individuals AGA testing is a routinely used blood test for possible presence of coeliac disease, allergies or idiopathic phenomena. The measurement of AGA is done with ELISA or radioimmunoassay. Such tests measure the level of AGA relative to a standard, such as a level of 10 = point which 85% of normal population falls below. Greater than 10 equals disease and a value of 3 is expected (mean).

Individuals who have coeliac disease may have values in excess of 200. There is the common expectation that removal of gluten results in the loss of AGA; however, since gluten is the target of the antibodies, that which would deplete them from the body, removal of gluten results in the benign circulation of antibodies. The half life of these antibodies is typically 120 days. Given an expected normal of 3 and assuming that the individual starts with a score of 203, we can predict the levels of AGA at various future time points. Based on these initial numbers, patients with very high
AGA values may take 2 years to return to the normal range.

Refractory coeliac disease (RCD). RCD or non-strict gluten-free diet are two causes of failure of AGA to return to normality on the GF diet. In the first instance lymphocytes may remain stimulated even though the antigen that originally stimulated them was removed from the diet.

Diagnostic serology
Anti-gliadin antibodies were one of the first serological markers for coeliac disease. Problematic with AGA is the typical sensitivity and specificity was about 85%. Gliadin peptides which are synthesized as the deamidated form have much higher sensitivity and specificity, creating 2 serological tests for CD that approach biopsy diagnostic in performance.

Uses in testing
Anti-gliadin antibodies can be generated in mice or rabbits by immunizing whole purified gliadins, proteolytic fragments of gliadin, or synthetic peptides that represent epitopes of gliadin. After developing an immune response, B-cells from mice can be fused with immortalizing cells to form a hybridoma that produces monoclonal antibodies (Mab or MoAb). Mab can be expressed in culture or via ascites fluid production to produce large amounts of a single antibody isoform.

Mab can be used to detect levels of gluten in food products. Some of these antibodies can recognize only wheat prolamins or very closely related grass seeds; others can detect antigens over broad taxa. The G12 antibody  is the newest example which detects the most immunotoxic fragment, a 33-mer peptide from α-2 gliadin; available from Romer Laboratories and the Spanish company Biomedal. It recognizes the toxic fraction of wheat, barley, rye and also of oat.

The R5 sandwich assay is another such assay. This assay can recognize wheat, barley and rye, which makes it ideal for evaluating the presence of contaminants in gluten-free foods that do not contain oat. This antibody is a recommended testing protocol in a proposed revision of the Codex Alimentarius.

The new standards came about in part because of new sensitive and specific testing procedures. These procedures are capable of detecting wheat or multiple cereals at concentrations as low as 1 part per million (PPM or 1 mg/kg). A new barley-sensitive ELISA called the R5 sandwich assay does not detect gluten in any of 25 pure oat varieties, but it does detect barley, wheat and rye.

References

G
Gluten sensitivity